Louder Than Hell is the eighth album by heavy metal band Manowar, released on October 1, 1996. It is the first album to feature guitarist Karl Logan, as well as the return of drummer Scott Columbus. Cover art was done by Ken Kelly. The songs "Brothers of Metal", "Courage" and "Number One" were demoed and played live by the band already in 1986, 10 years before their official album release.

Track listing 
All songs written by Joey DeMaio, except where noted.

Personnel

Manowar 
 Eric Adams – vocals
 Karl Logan – guitars
 Joey DeMaio – bass, keyboards
 Scott Columbus – drums

Additional musicians 
David Campbell – orchestral arrangements, conductor

Production 
Rich Breen – engineer
Ehab Haddad – assistant engineer
George Marino – mastering
John Pettigrass – recording supervisor

Charts

References 

1996 albums
Manowar albums
Albums with cover art by Ken Kelly (artist)
Geffen Records albums